Kari Cavén (born 13 March 1954 in Savonlinna) is a Finnish artist. He represented Finland at the Venice Biennale in 1988, 1990 and 1995.

Selected works 
 Cow Chapel (1993), Wanås Castle
 Waterfall (2001), Västra Hamnen, Malmö, Sweden
 Forest grove (2002), Umedalen skulpturpark

References

1954 births
Living people
20th-century Finnish sculptors
21st-century Finnish sculptors